The IPSC Swiss Handgun Championship is an IPSC level 3 championship held once a year by the Swiss Dynamic Shooting Federation.

Champions 
The following is a list of previous and current champions.

Overall category

Lady category

References 
Top-Results - IPSC Team by Christine Burkhalter and Dominic Meyer 

IPSC shooting competitions
National shooting championships
Shooting competitions in Switzerland